Cappelen is a Norwegian surname. Notable people with the surname include:

 Cappelen (family), a distinguished Norwegian family
 Andreas Zeier Cappelen (1915–2008), Norwegian jurist and politician
 August Cappelen (1827–1852), Norwegian painter
 Axel Cappelen (1858–1919), Norwegian surgeon
 Diderik von Cappelen (1761–1838), Norwegian businessman and politician
 Didrik Cappelen (1900–1970), resistance fighter, county judge and politician
 Frederick William Cappelen (1857–1921), Norwegian-born architect and Minneapolis City Engineer
 Hans Cappelen (Hasse) (1903–79), businessman, resistance fighter and Norwegian witness in the Nuremberg trials
 Herman Cappelen (born 1967), Norwegian philosopher
 Johan Cappelen (1889–1947), Norwegian jurist and politician
 Jørgen Wright Cappelen (1805–1878), Norwegian bookseller and publisher
 Nicolai Benjamin Cappelen (1795–1866), Norwegian jurist and politician
 Pål Cappelen (born 1947), Norwegian handball player
 Peder von Cappelen (1763–1837), Norwegian merchant and politician
 Sofie Cappelen (born 1982), Norwegian actress
 Ulrich Fredrich von Cappelen (1770–1820), Norwegian ship owner and businessman
 Ulrik Frederik Cappelen (1797–1864), Norwegian jurist and politician

See also
 J.W. Cappelens Forlag, a Norwegian publishing house founded in 1829
 Cappelen Damm, a Norwegian publisher established in 2007 following the merger of J.W. Cappelens Forlag and N.W. Damm & Søn
 F.W. Cappelen Memorial Bridge, a bridge in Minneapolis, United States
 Cappeln, a municipality in Germany

Norwegian-language surnames